Kančevci (Prekmurje Slovene: Kančovci) is a village in the Municipality of Moravske Toplice in the Prekmurje region of Slovenia.

Church
The parish church, built to the east of the main settlement, is dedicated to Saint Benedict. It was first mentioned in written sources dating to 1208. It has a single nave with a polygonal choir and was extensively renovated and rebuilt in a Neo-Romanesque style in 1898. It belongs to the Roman Catholic Diocese of Murska Sobota.

Notable people
Miklós Küzmics (1737–1804), writer

References

External links

Kančevci on Geopedia

Populated places in the Municipality of Moravske Toplice